Mohr is a surname of German origin.  Notable people with the surname include:

Alexander Mohr (1892–1974), German Expressionist artist
Bill Mohr (1909–1971), Australian rules footballer
Charles Mohr (botanist) (1824–1901), German-American botanical writer
Charles Mohr (journalist) (1929–1989), American writer for Time
Christopher Garrett Mohr (born 1966), American football player
Christian Otto Mohr (1835–1918), German civil engineer
Clinton Mohr (born 1966), Australian rugby league footballer
Daniel Matthias Heinrich Mohr (1780–1808), German botanist
Dustan Mohr (born 1976), American former Major League baseball player
Erna Mohr (1894–1968), German zoologist 
Ernst Mohr (1910–1989), German mechanical engineer
Georg Mohr (1640–1697), Danish mathematician
Gerald Mohr (1914–1968), American actor
Hal Mohr (1894–1974), American cinematographer
Heidi Mohr (born 1967), German football (soccer) player
Howard R. Mohr (1921-1977), American politician and businessman
Jacqueline J. Mohr, American Professor of Marketing
Jay Mohr (born 1970), American actor and comedian
Jean Mohr (1925–2018), Swiss documentary photographer
Johann Georg Mohr (1864–1943), German painter
Johan Maurits Mohr (1716–1775), Dutch-German astronomer
John P. Mohr (1910–1997), United States FBI administrator
Joseph Hermann Mohr (1834–1892), German Jesuit and hymnodist
Joseph Mohr (1792–1848), Austrian priest and composer
Karl Friedrich Mohr (1806–1879), German pharmacist
Lawrence B. Mohr (born 1931), American political scientist
Manfred Mohr (born 1938), German digital art pioneer
Morris Mohr (1907–1956), New York politician
Philipp Mohr (born 1972), German architect and industrial designer
Robert Mohr (1897–1977), Gestapo interrogation specialist
Robert Mohr (rugby) (born 1978), German rugby union player
Sigismund Mohr (1827–1893), Canadian electrical engineer
Thomas Mohr (politician), American politician
Thomas Mohr (tenor) (born 1961), German tenor and academic teacher
Tobias Mohr (born 1995), German football (soccer) player
Wilhelm Mohr (journalist) (1838-1888), German journalist

Surnames from nicknames
German-language surnames